Eps is a compilation album by Robert Wyatt. It was released on February 9, 1999 by Thirsty Ear Records/Domino Records.

Track listing

Robert Wyatt albums
1999 albums